Karanjkot is a village in Golamunda block of Kalahandi district, Odisha state, India. It is situated in a place covered with forest and mountains.

Villages in Kalahandi district